Mockfjärd is a locality situated in Gagnef Municipality, Dalarna County, Sweden with 1,937 inhabitants in 2010 and 1,919 in 2013.

References 

Populated places in Dalarna County
Populated places in Gagnef Municipality